Mixtopelta is a monotypic genus of bryozoans belonging to the monotypic family Mixtopeltidae. The only species is Mixtopelta indica.

References

Cheilostomatida
Bryozoan genera
Monotypic bryozoan genera